The Pakistan football league system consists of interconnected leagues for football clubs in Pakistan. The system has a hierarchical format with promotion and relegation between leagues.

The system

See also
 Football in Pakistan

External links
www.pff.com.pk - Official website